Troy Stoudermire (born July 1, 1990) is an American professional Canadian football defensive back and return specialist who plays for the Caudillos de Chihuahua of the Fútbol Americano de México. He played college football at Minnesota. He has also been a member of the Cincinnati Bengals, Saskatchewan Roughriders, Winnipeg Blue Bombers, Minnesota Vikings, Edmonton Eskimos, Calgary Stampeders, and Ottawa Redblacks.

Early years
Stoudermire played high school football at Skyline High School in Dallas, Texas. He rushed for 1,153 yards and 10 touchdowns on 150 carries, with 7.7 yards per carry, his senior year in 2007. He also recorded 19 receptions for 268 yards and three touchdowns, passed for 514 yards and a four scores and returned three punts for touchdowns. Stoudermire attended Seagoville High School his junior year, rushing for  2,135 yards and scoring 26 total touchdowns.

College career
Stoudermire played for the Minnesota Golden Gophers from 2008 to 2012. He was medically redshirted in 2011. He finished his college career as FBS football's all-time leader in kickoff return yards with 3,615 yards on 144 returns.

Professional career

Cincinnati Bengals
Stoudermire was signed by the Cincinnati Bengals on April 30, 2013, after going undrafted in the 2013 NFL Draft. He was released by the Bengals on August 18, 2013.

Saskatchewan Roughriders
Stoudermire was signed to the Saskatchewan Roughriders' practice roster on October 8, 2013. He was released by the Roughriders on June 21, 2014.

Winnipeg Blue Bombers
Stoudermire was signed by the Winnipeg Blue Bombers on June 29, 2014. He was named Special Teams Player of the Week for week ten of the 2014 CFL season after returning a punt 64 yards for his first CFL touchdown. Stoudermire played for two seasons in Winnipeg, scoring two return touchdowns, as well as catching 8 passes for 40 yards.

Minnesota Vikings
Stoudermire was signed by the Minnesota Vikings on May 9, 2016, as a wide receiver. He was released on August 30, 2016.

Edmonton Eskimos
Stoudermire was signed to the Edmonton Eskimos' practice roster on September 13, 2016. Although he was brought up to the active roster to provide more explosiveness than regular returner Kenzel Doe, Stoudermire had fumbling issues, and after 4 games ended up on the injured list. Stoudermire also caught one pass for 6 yards. He would spend 2017 out of football.

Calgary Stampeders
Stoudermire was signed by the Calgary Stampeders on March 19, 2018. Injuries limited Stoudermire to 9 games, where he recorded 9 tackles and 6 special teams tackles, all career highs. However, as a returner, his usage and effectiveness saw a steep decline, putting up only 212 total yards. The Stampeders did go on to win the 106th Grey Cup at the end of the season.

Ottawa Redblacks
Stoudermire signed with Ottawa on the second day of free agency. After spending a stint on the 6 game injured list, Stoudermire was released without playing a regular season game for the Redblacks.

Mexico
He signed with the Caudillos de Chihuahua of the Fútbol Americano de México ahead of the 2021 season.

References

External links
College stats
Winnipeg Blue Bombers bio
Minnesota Vikings bio

1990 births
Living people
African-American players of American football
African-American players of Canadian football
American football defensive backs
American football wide receivers
Canadian football defensive backs
Cincinnati Bengals players
Edmonton Elks players
Minnesota Golden Gophers football players
Minnesota Vikings players
Players of American football from Dallas
Players of Canadian football from Dallas
Saskatchewan Roughriders players
Winnipeg Blue Bombers players
Skyline High School (Dallas) alumni
Calgary Stampeders players
American expatriate players of American football
American expatriate sportspeople in Mexico
21st-century African-American sportspeople